Mariko Kihara (born September 4, 1997) is a Japanese figure skater. She has won three senior internationals – the 2014 Coupe du Printemps, 2015 Bavarian Open, and 2016 Triglav Trophy.

Programs

Competitive highlights 
GP: Grand Prix; CS: Challenger Series; JGP: Junior Grand Prix

References

External links 
 

1997 births
Japanese female single skaters
Living people
People from Ōtsu, Shiga
Competitors at the 2017 Winter Universiade